The Limbach L1700 is a series of type certified German aircraft engines, designed and produced by Limbach Flugmotoren of Königswinter for use in light aircraft and motorgliders.

The series were originally designated as the SL1700 under its former certification and was changed to L1700 by company Service Bulletin no. 17.

Design and development
The L1700 is a four-cylinder four-stroke, horizontally-opposed air-cooled, gasoline direct-dive engine design, based upon the Volkswagen air-cooled engine. It employs a single magneto ignition, one carburettor, is lubricated by a wet sump and produces  at 3600 rpm.

The L1700 was type certified by the European Aviation Safety Agency on 4 August 2006. The first engines in the series had originally been certified by the German Luftfahrt-Bundesamt (LBA) on 6 December 1971.

Variants
L1700 EA
Version that puts out  for takeoff and  continuously.
L 1700 EB 
Version that puts out  for takeoff and  continuously.
L1700 EO/EC
Version that puts out  for takeoff and  continuously.
L 1700 ED
Version that puts out  for takeoff and  continuously.

Applications

Specifications (L1700 EO/EC)

See also

References

External links

Limbach aircraft engines
Air-cooled aircraft piston engines